Fornasari was an Italian car manufacturer that was created in 1999 by . The company made sports cars and SUVs. On 9 September 2015 Fornasari was declared bankrupt by the Tribunal of Vicenza.

Models

Model lineup:

 Fornasari RR450, a three-door SUV mounted with a Chevrolet engine with 450 hp, Speed , 0–100 km/h in 4.5 sec 
 Fornasari RR600, a three-door SUV mounted with a Chevrolet engine with 600 hp, Speed , 0–100 km/h in 4.2 sec 
 Fornasari Racing Buggy, a street legal three-door buggy made for racing.
 Fornasari Tender, a two-door offroad pickup with yacht-like styling.
 Fornasari Gruppo B, a non-offroad "hot hatch" version of the RR450/RR600.

References

External links
 Fornasaricars.com, official page

Defunct motor vehicle manufacturers of Italy
Vehicle manufacturing companies established in 1999
Sports car manufacturers
Companies based in Veneto
Vehicle manufacturing companies disestablished in 2015
Italian companies established in 1999
2015 disestablishments in Italy